

Peerage of England

|Duke of Cornwall (1337)||Henry Frederick Stuart||1603||1612||
|-
|Duke of York (1605)||Charles Stuart||1605||1625||New creation
|-
|Marquess of Winchester (1551)||William Paulet, 4th Marquess of Winchester||1598||1628||
|-
|Earl of Arundel (1138)||Thomas Howard, 21st Earl of Arundel||1604||1646||Restored, also as Earl of Surrey
|-
|rowspan="2"|Earl of Oxford (1142)||Edward de Vere, 17th Earl of Oxford||1562||1604||Died
|-
|Henry de Vere, 18th Earl of Oxford||1604||1625||
|-
|Earl of Shrewsbury (1442)||Gilbert Talbot, 7th Earl of Shrewsbury||1590||1616||
|-
|Earl of Kent (1465)||Henry Grey, 6th Earl of Kent||1573||1615||
|-
|Earl of Derby (1485)||William Stanley, 6th Earl of Derby||1594||1642||
|-
|Earl of Worcester (1514)||Edward Somerset, 4th Earl of Worcester||1589||1628||
|-
|rowspan="2"|Earl of Cumberland (1525)||George Clifford, 3rd Earl of Cumberland||1570||1605||Died
|-
|Francis Clifford, 4th Earl of Cumberland||1605||1641||
|-
|Earl of Rutland (1525)||Roger Manners, 5th Earl of Rutland||1588||1612||
|-
|rowspan="2"|Earl of Huntington (1529)||George Hastings, 4th Earl of Huntingdon||1595||1604||Died
|-
|Henry Hastings, 5th Earl of Huntingdon||1604||1643||
|-
|Earl of Sussex (1529)||Robert Radclyffe, 5th Earl of Sussex||1593||1629||
|-
|Earl of Bath (1536)||William Bourchier, 3rd Earl of Bath||1561||1623||
|-
|Earl of Southampton (1547)||Henry Wriothesley, 3rd Earl of Southampton||1581||1624||
|-
|Earl of Bedford (1550)||Edward Russell, 3rd Earl of Bedford||1585||1627||
|-
|rowspan="2"|Earl of Pembroke (1551)||Henry Herbert, 2nd Earl of Pembroke||1570||1601||Died
|-
|William Herbert, 3rd Earl of Pembroke||1601||1630||
|-
|Earl of Devon (1553)||William Courtenay, de jure 3rd Earl of Devon||1557||1630||
|-
|Earl of Northumberland (1557)||Henry Percy, 9th Earl of Northumberland||1585||1632||
|-
|Earl of Hertford (1559)||Edward Seymour, 1st Earl of Hertford||1559||1621||
|-
|rowspan="2"|Earl of Essex (1572)||Robert Devereux, 2nd Earl of Essex||1576||1601||Attainted and his honours became forfeited
|-
|Robert Devereux, 3rd Earl of Essex||1604||1646||Restored
|-
|Earl of Lincoln (1572)||Henry Clinton, 2nd Earl of Lincoln||1585||1616||
|-
|Earl of Nottingham (1596)||Charles Howard, 1st Earl of Nottingham||1596||1624||
|-
|Earl of Devonshire (1603)||Charles Blount, Earl of Devonshire||1603||1606||New creation; died, title extinct
|-
|Earl of Suffolk (1603)||Thomas Howard, 1st Earl of Suffolk||1603||1626||New creation
|-
|rowspan="3"|Earl of Dorset (1604)||Thomas Sackville, 1st Earl of Dorset||1604||1608||New creation; died
|-
|Robert Sackville, 2nd Earl of Dorset||1608||1609||Died
|-
|Richard Sackville, 3rd Earl of Dorset||1609||1624||
|-
|Earl of Northampton (1604)||Henry Howard, 1st Earl of Northampton||1604||1614||New creation
|-
|Earl of Exeter (1605)||Thomas Cecil, 1st Earl of Exeter||1605||1623||New creation
|-
|Earl of Montgomery (1605)||Philip Herbert, 1st Earl of Montgomery||1605||1649||New creation
|-
|Earl of Salisbury (1605)||Robert Cecil, 1st Earl of Salisbury||1605||1612||New creation; Viscount Cranborne in 1604, Baron Cecil of Essendon in 1603
|-
|Viscount Montagu (1554)||Anthony-Maria Browne, 2nd Viscount Montagu||1592||1629||
|-
|Viscount Howard of Bindon (1559)||Thomas Howard, 3rd Viscount Howard of Bindon||1590||1611||
|-
|Viscount Lisle (1605)||Robert Sidney, 1st Viscount Lisle||1605||1626||New creation; Baron Sydney in 1603
|-
|Baron de Ros (1264)||William Cecil, 17th Baron de Ros||1591||1618||
|-
|Baron le Despencer (1264)||Mary Fane, 3rd Baroness le Despenser||1604||1626||Abeyance terminated in her favour
|-
|Baron Grey de Wilton (1295)||Thomas Grey, 15th Baron Grey de Wilton||1593||1604||Attainted, and his honours became forfeited
|-
|Baron de Clifford (1299)||Anne Clifford, 14th Baroness de Clifford||1605||1676||Title previously held by the Earls of Cumberland
|- 
|Baron Morley (1299)||Edward Parker, 12th Baron Morley||1577||1618||
|- 
|Baron Zouche of Haryngworth (1308)||Edward la Zouche, 11th Baron Zouche||1569||1625||
|- 
|Baron Audley of Heleigh (1313)||George Tuchet, 11th Baron Audley||1563||1617||
|- 
|Baron Cobham of Kent (1313)||Henry Brooke, 11th Baron Cobham||1597||1603||Attainted and his honours became forfeited
|- 
|rowspan="2"|Baron Willoughby de Eresby (1313)||Peregrine Bertie, 13th Baron Willoughby de Eresby||1580||1601||Died
|- 
|Robert Bertie, 14th Baron Willoughby de Eresby||1601||1640||
|- 
|Baron Dacre (1321)||Margaret Fiennes, 11th Baroness Dacre||1594||1612||
|- 
|rowspan="2"|Baron Scrope of Bolton (1371)||Thomas Scrope, 10th Baron Scrope of Bolton||1591||1609||Died
|- 
|Emanuel Scrope, 11th Baron Scrope of Bolton||1609||1630||
|- 
|Baron Bergavenny (1392)||Mary Fane, 7th Baroness Bergavenny||1585||1626||Succeeded to the more senior Barony le Despencer; Barony of Bergavenny held by her heirs until 1762, when it fell into abeyance
|- 
|Baron Berkeley (1421)||Henry Berkeley, 7th Baron Berkeley||1534||1613||
|- 
|Baron Dudley (1440)||Edward Sutton, 5th Baron Dudley||1586||1643||
|- 
|Baron Saye and Sele (1447)||Richard Fiennes, 7th Baron Saye and Sele||1573||1613||
|- 
|Baron Stourton (1448)||Edward Stourton, 10th Baron Stourton||1588||1633||
|- 
|Baron Mountjoy (1465)||Charles Blount, 8th Baron Mountjoy||1594||1606||Created Earl of Devonshire in 1603, died, both titles extinct
|- 
|rowspan="2"|Baron Willoughby de Broke (1491)||Fulke Greville, 4th Baron Willoughby de Broke||1562||1606||Died
|- 
|Fulke Greville, 5th Baron Willoughby de Broke||1606||1628||
|- 
|Baron Monteagle (1514)||William Parker, 4th Baron Monteagle||1581||1622||
|-
|Baron Vaux of Harrowden (1523)||Edward Vaux, 4th Baron Vaux of Harrowden||1595||1661||
|-
|Baron Sandys of the Vine (1529)||William Sandys, 3rd Baron Sandys||1560||1623||
|-
|Baron Burgh (1529)||Robert Burgh, 4th Baron Burgh||1597||1602||Died, title fell into abeyance until 1916
|-
|rowspan="2"|Baron Windsor (1529)||Henry Windsor, 5th Baron Windsor||1585||1605||Died
|-
|Thomas Windsor, 6th Baron Windsor||1605||1642||
|-
|Baron Wentworth (1529)||Thomas Wentworth, 4th Baron Wentworth||1593||1667||
|-
|rowspan="3"|Baron Mordaunt (1532)||Lewis Mordaunt, 3rd Baron Mordaunt||1571||1601||Died
|-
|Henry Mordaunt, 4th Baron Mordaunt||1601||1609||Died
|-
|John Mordaunt, 5th Baron Mordaunt||1609||1644||
|-
|rowspan="2"|Baron Cromwell (1540)||Edward Cromwell, 3rd Baron Cromwell||1593||1607||Died
|-
|Thomas Cromwell, 4th Baron Cromwell||1607||1653||
|-
|Baron Eure (1544)||Ralph Eure, 3rd Baron Eure||1594||1617||
|-
|Baron Wharton (1545)||Philip Wharton, 3rd Baron Wharton||1572||1625||
|-
|Baron Sheffield (1547)||Edmund Sheffield, 3rd Baron Sheffield||1568||1646||
|-
|Baron Rich (1547)||Robert Rich, 3rd Baron Rich||1581||1618||
|-
|Baron Willoughby of Parham (1547)||Charles Willoughby, 2nd Baron Willoughby of Parham||1570||1612||
|-
|Baron Lumley (1547)||John Lumley, 1st Baron Lumley||1547||1609||Died, title extinct
|-
|rowspan="2"|Baron Darcy of Aston (1548)||John Darcy, 2nd Baron Darcy of Aston||1558||1602||Died
|-
|John Darcy, 3rd Baron Darcy of Aston||1602||1635||
|-
|Baron Darcy of Chiche (1551)||Thomas Darcy, 3rd Baron Darcy of Chiche||1581||1640||
|-
|Baron Paget (1552)||William Paget, 4th Baron Paget||1604||1629||Restored
|-
|rowspan="2"|Baron North (1554)||Roger North, 2nd Baron North||1564||1600||Died
|-
|Dudley North, 3rd Baron North||1600||1666||
|-
|rowspan="2"|Baron Chandos (1554)||William Brydges, 4th Baron Chandos||1594||1602||Died
|-
|Grey Brydges, 5th Baron Chandos||1602||1621||
|-
|rowspan="2"|Baron Hunsdon (1559)||George Carey, 2nd Baron Hunsdon||1596||1603||Died
|-
|John Carey, 3rd Baron Hunsdon||1603||1617||
|-
|Baron St John of Bletso (1559)||Oliver St John, 3rd Baron St John of Bletso||1596||1618||
|-
|Baron Buckhurst (1567)||Thomas Sackville, 1st Baron Buckhurst||1567||1608||Created Earl of Dorset in 1604, see above
|-
|rowspan="2"|Baron De La Warr (1570)||Thomas West, 2nd Baron De La Warr||1595||1602||Died
|-
|Thomas West, 3rd Baron De La Warr||1602||1618||
|-
|Baron Burghley (1571)||Thomas Cecil, 2nd Baron Burghley||1598||1623||Created Earl of Exeter in 1604, see above
|-
|Baron Compton (1572)||William Compton, 2nd Baron Compton||1589||1630||
|-
|rowspan="2"|Baron Norreys (1572)||Henry Norris, 1st Baron Norreys||1572||1601||Died
|-
|Francis Norris, 2nd Baron Norreys||1601||1622||
|-
|Baron Howard de Walden (1597)||Thomas Howard, 1st Earl of Suffolk||1597||1626||Created Earl of Suffolk in 1603; Barony held by his heirs until 1689 when it fell into abeyance
|-
|Baron Knollys (1603)||William Knollys, 1st Baron Knollys||1603||1632||New creation
|-
|Baron (A)bergavenny (1604)||Edward Nevill, 1st Baron Bergavenny||1604||1622||New creation
|-
|Baron Danvers (1603)||Henry Danvers, 1st Baron Danvers||1603||1644||New creation
|-
|Baron Ellesmere (1603)||Thomas Egerton, 1st Baron Ellesmere||1603||1617||New creation
|-
|Baron Gerard (1603)||Thomas Gerard, 1st Baron Gerard||1603||1617||New creation
|-
|Baron Grey of Groby (1603)||Henry Grey, 1st Baron Grey of Groby||1603||1614||New creation
|-
|Baron Harington of Exton (1603)||John Harington, 1st Baron Harington of Exton||1603||1613||New creation
|-
|Baron Petre (1603)||John Petre, 1st Baron Petre||1603||1613||New creation
|-
|Baron Russell of Thornhaugh (1603)||William Russell, 1st Baron Russell of Thornhaugh||1603||1613||New creation
|-
|Baron Spencer (1603)||Robert Spencer, 1st Baron Spencer of Wormleighton||1603||1627||New creation
|-
|Baron Wotton (1603)||Edward Wotton, 1st Baron Wotton||1603||1628||New creation
|-
|Baron Denny (1604)||Edward Denny, 1st Baron Denny||1604||1630||New creation
|-
|Baron Arundell of Wardour (1605)||Thomas Arundell, 1st Baron Arundell of Wardour||1605||1639||New creation
|-
|Baron Carew (1605)||George Carew, 1st Baron Carew||1605||1629||New creation
|-
|Baron Cavendish of Hardwick (1605)||William Cavendish, 1st Baron Cavendish of Hardwick||1605||1626||New creation
|-
|Baron Stanhope of Harrington (1605)||John Stanhope, 1st Baron Stanhope||1605||1621||New creation
|-
|Baron Hay (1606)||James Hay, 1st Baron Hay||1606||1636||New creation
|-
|Baron Knyvett (1607)||Thomas Knyvet, 1st Baron Knyvet||1607||1622||New creation
|-
|Baron Clifton (1608)||Gervase Clifton, 1st Baron Clifton||1608||1618||New creation
|-
|}

Peerage of Scotland

|Duke of Rothesay (1398)||Henry Frederick Stuart, Duke of Rothesay||1594||1612||
|-
|Duke of Lennox (1581)||Ludovic Stewart, 2nd Duke of Lennox||1583||1624||
|-
|Duke of Albany (1600)||Charles Stuart, 1st Duke of Albany||1600||1625||New creation
|-
|Duke of Kintyre and Lorne (1602)||Robert Stuart, Duke of Kintyre and Lorne||1602||1602||New creation; died, title extinct
|-
|Marquess of Huntly (1599)||George Gordon, 1st Marquess of Huntly||1599||1636||
|-
|rowspan=2|Marquess of Hamilton (1599)||John Hamilton, 1st Marquess of Hamilton||1599||1604||Died
|-
|James Hamilton, 2nd Marquess of Hamilton||1604||1625||
|-
|Earl of Angus (1389)||William Douglas, 10th Earl of Angus||1591||1611||
|-
|Earl of Argyll (1457)||Archibald Campbell, 7th Earl of Argyll||1584||1638||
|-
|rowspan=2|Earl of Crawford (1398)||David Lindsay, 11th Earl of Crawford||1574||1607||Died
|-
|David Lindsay, 12th Earl of Crawford||1607||1620||
|-
|Earl of Erroll (1452)||Francis Hay, 9th Earl of Erroll||1585||1631||
|-
|Earl Marischal (1458)||George Keith, 5th Earl Marischal||1581||1623||
|-
|Earl of Sutherland (1235)||John Gordon, 13th Earl of Sutherland||1594||1615||
|-
|Earl of Mar (1114)||John Erskine, 19th/2nd Earl of Mar||1572||1634||
|-
|Earl of Rothes (1458)||Andrew Leslie, 5th Earl of Rothes||1558||1611||
|-
|rowspan=2|Earl of Morton (1458)||William Douglas, 6th Earl of Morton||1588||1606||Died
|-
|William Douglas, 7th Earl of Morton||1606||1648||
|-
|Earl of Menteith (1427)||William Graham, 7th Earl of Menteith||1598||1661||
|-
|Earl of Glencairn (1488)||James Cunningham, 7th Earl of Glencairn||1578||1630||
|-
|Earl of Eglinton (1507)||Hugh Montgomerie, 5th Earl of Eglinton||1586||1612||
|-
|Earl of Arran (1503)||James Hamilton, 3rd Earl of Arran||1575||1609||Died, title succeeded by the Marquess of Hamilton, see above
|-
|rowspan=2|Earl of Montrose (1503)||John Graham, 3rd Earl of Montrose||1571||1608||Died
|-
|John Graham, 4th Earl of Montrose||1608||1626||
|-
|Earl of Cassilis (1509)||John Kennedy, 5th Earl of Cassilis||1576||1615||
|-
|Earl of Caithness (1455)||George Sinclair, 5th Earl of Caithness||1582||1643||
|-
|rowspan=2|Earl of Buchan (1469)||James Douglas, 5th Earl of Buchan||1580||1601||Died
|-
|Mary Douglas, 6th Countess of Buchan||1601||1628||
|-
|Earl of Moray (1562)||James Stuart, 3rd Earl of Moray||1591||1638||
|-
|Earl of Orkney (1581)||Patrick Stewart, 2nd Earl of Orkney||1593||1614||
|-
|Earl of Gowrie (1581)||John Ruthven, 3rd Earl of Gowrie||1588||1600||Title forfeited
|-
|rowspan=2|Earl of Atholl (1596)||John Stewart, 1st Earl of Atholl||1596||1603||Died
|-
|James Stewart, 2nd Earl of Atholl||1603||1625||
|-
|Earl of Linlithgow (1600)||Alexander Livingstone, 1st Earl of Linlithgow||1600||1621||New creation
|-
|rowspan=3|Earl of Winton (1600)||Robert Seton, 1st Earl of Winton||1600||1603||New creation; died
|-
|Robert Seton, 2nd Earl of Winton||1603||1607||Resigned
|-
|George Seton, 3rd Earl of Winton||1607||1650||
|-
|Earl of Home (1605)||Alexander Home, 1st Earl of Home||1605||1619||New creation
|-
|Earl of Perth (1605)||James Drummond, 1st Earl of Perth||1605||1611||New creation
|-
|Earl of Dunfermline (1605)||Alexander Seton, 1st Earl of Dunfermline||1605||1622||New creation
|-
|Earl of Dunbar (1605)||George Home, 1st Earl of Dunbar||1605||1611||New creation
|-
|Earl of Wigtown (1606)||John Fleming, 1st Earl of Wigtown||1606||1619||New creation
|-
|Earl of Abercorn (1606)||James Hamilton, 1st Earl of Abercorn||1606||1618||New creation (also created Baron Abercorn in 1603)
|-
|Earl of Kinghorne (1606)||Patrick Lyon, 1st Earl of Kinghorne||1606||1615||New creation
|-
|rowspan=2|Earl of Lothian (1606)||Mark Kerr, 1st Earl of Lothian||1606||1609||New creation; died
|-
|Robert Kerr, 2nd Earl of Lothian||1609||1624||
|-
|rowspan=2|Earl of Tullibardine (1606)||John Murray, 1st Earl of Tullibardine||1606||1609||New creation; died
|-
|William Murray, 2nd Earl of Tullibardine||1609||1626||
|-
|Viscount of Fentoun (1606)||Thomas Erskine, 1st Viscount of Fentoun||1606||1639||New creation, also created Lord Erskine of Dirleton in 1603
|-
|Viscount of Haddington (1606)||John Ramsay, 1st Viscount of Haddington||1606||1626||New creation
|-
|Lord Somerville (1430)||Gilbert Somerville, 8th Lord Somerville||1597||1618||
|-
|rowspan=2|Lord Forbes (1442)||John Forbes, 8th Lord Forbes||1593||1606||
|-
|Arthur Forbes, 9th Lord Forbes||1606||1641||
|-
|Lord Maxwell (1445)||John Maxwell, 9th Lord Maxwell||1593||1613||
|-
|Lord Glamis (1445)||Patrick Lyon, 9th Lord Glamis||1578||1615||Created Earl of Kinghorne, see above
|-
|rowspan=3|Lord Lindsay of the Byres (1445)||James Lindsay, 7th Lord Lindsay||1589||1601||Died
|-
|John Lindsay, 8th Lord Lindsay||1601||1609||
|-
|Robert Lindsay, 9th Lord Lindsay||1609||1619||
|-
|Lord Saltoun (1445)||John Abernethy, 8th Lord Saltoun||1590||1612||
|-
|rowspan=2|Lord Gray (1445)||Patrick Gray, 5th Lord Gray||1584||1608||Died
|-
|Patrick Gray, 6th Lord Gray||1608||1611||
|-
|rowspan=4|Lord Sinclair (1449)||Henry Sinclair, 5th Lord Sinclair||1570||1601||Died
|-
|Henry Sinclair, 6th Lord Sinclair||1601||1602||Died
|-
|James Sinclair, 7th Lord Sinclair||1602||1607||Died
|-
|Patrick Sinclair, 8th Lord Sinclair||1607||1615||
|-
|Lord Fleming (1451)||John Fleming, 6th Lord Fleming||1572||1619||Created Earl of Wigtown, see above
|-
|Lord Seton (1451)||Robert Seton, 8th Lord Seton||1586||1603||Created Earl of Winton, see above
|-
|Lord Borthwick (1452)||John Borthwick, 8th Lord Borthwick||1599||1623||
|-
|Lord Boyd (1454)||Thomas Boyd, 6th Lord Boyd||1590||1611||
|-
|Lord Oliphant (1455)||Laurence Oliphant, 5th Lord Oliphant||1593||1631||
|-
|Lord Livingston (1458)||Alexander Livingston, 7th Lord Livingston||1592||1623||Created Earl of Linlithgow, see above
|-
|Lord Cathcart (1460)||Alan Cathcart, 4th Lord Cathcart||1547||1618||
|-
|Lord Lovat (1464)||Simon Fraser, 6th Lord Lovat||1577||1633||
|-
|rowspan=2|Lord Carlyle of Torthorwald (1473)||Elizabeth Douglas, 5th Lady Carlyle||1575||1605||Died
|-
|James Douglas, 6th Lord Carlyle||1605||1638||
|-
|Lord Home (1473)||Alexander Home, 6th Lord Home||1575||1619||Created Earl of Home, see above
|-
|Lord Crichton of Sanquhar (1488)||Robert Crichton, 8th Lord Crichton of Sanquhar||1569||1612||
|-
|rowspan=2|Lord Drummond of Cargill (1488)||Patrick Drummond, 3rd Lord Drummond||1571||1600||Died
|-
|James Drummond, 4th Lord Drummond||1600||1611||Created Earl of Perth, see above
|-
|rowspan=2|Lord Hay of Yester (1488)||James Hay, 7th Lord Hay of Yester||1591||1609||Died
|-
|John Hay, 8th Lord Hay of Yester||1609||1653||
|-
|Lord Sempill (1489)||Robert Sempill, 4th Lord Sempill||1576||1611||
|-
|rowspan=2|Lord Herries of Terregles (1490)||William Maxwell, 5th Lord Herries of Terregles||1594||1604||Died
|-
|John Maxwell, 6th Lord Herries of Terregles||1604||1631||
|-
|rowspan=2|Lord Ogilvy of Airlie (1491)||James Ogilvy, 5th Lord Ogilvy of Airlie||1549||1606||Died
|-
|James Ogilvy, 6th Lord Ogilvy of Airlie||1606||1617||
|-
|Lord Ross (1499)||James Ross, 6th Lord Ross||1595||1633||
|-
|rowspan=2|Lord Elphinstone (1509)||Robert Elphinstone, 3rd Lord Elphinstone||1547||1602||Died
|-
|Alexander, 4th Lord Elphinstone||1602||1638||
|-
|Lord Ochiltree (1543)||Andrew Stuart, 3rd Lord Ochiltree||1591||1615||
|-
|Lord Torphichen (1564)||James Sandilands, 2nd Lord Torphichen||1579||1617||
|-
|Lord Paisley (1587)||Claud Hamilton, 1st Lord Paisley||1587||1621||
|-
|Lord Maitland (1590)||John Maitland, 2nd Lord Maitland of Thirlestane||1595||1645||
|-
|rowspan=2|Lord Spynie (1590)||Alexander Lindsay, 1st Lord Spynie||1590||1607||Died
|-
|Alexander Lindsay, 2nd Lord Spynie||1607||1646||
|-
|Lord Newbottle (1591)||Mark Kerr, 1st Lord Newbottle||1591||1609||Created Earl of Lothian, see above
|-
|Lord Fyvie (1598)||Alexander Seton, 1st Lord Fyvie||1598||1622||Created Earl of Dunfermline, see above
|-
|Lord Roxburghe (1600)||Robert Ker, 1st Lord Roxburghe||1600||1650||New creation
|-
|rowspan=2|Lord Lindores (1600)||Patrick Leslie, 1st Lord Lindores||1600||1608||New creation; died
|-
|Patrick Leslie, 2nd Lord Lindores||1608||1649||
|-
|Lord Campbell of Loudoun (1601)||Hugh Campbell, 1st Lord Campbell of Loudoun||1601||1619||New creation
|-
|Lord Kinloss (1602)||Edward Bruce, 1st Lord Kinloss||1602||1611||New creation; created Lord Bruce of Kinloss in 1608
|-
|Lord Colville of Culross (1604)||James Colville, 1st Lord Colville of Culross||1604||1629||New creation
|-
|Lord Scone (1605)||David Murray, 1st Lord Scone||1605||1631||New creation
|-
|Lord Balmerinoch (1606)||James Elphinstone, 1st Lord Balmerinoch||1606||1612||New creation
|-
|Lord Blantyre (1606)||Walter Stewart, 1st Lord Blantyre||1606||1617||New creation
|-
|Lord Scott of Buccleuch (1606)||Walter Scott, 1st Lord Scott of Buccleuch||1606||1611||New creation
|-
|Lord Coupar (1607)||James Elphinstone, 1st Lord Coupar||1607||1669||New creation
|-
|rowspan=2|Lord Holyroodhouse (1607)||John Bothwell, 1st Lord Holyroodhouse||1607||1609||New creation; died
|-
|John Bothwell, 2nd Lord Holyroodhouse||1609||1638||
|-
|Lord Garlies (1607)||Alexander Stewart, 1st Lord Garlies||1607||1649||New creation
|-
|Lord Balfour of Burleigh (1607)||Michael Balfour, 1st Lord Balfour of Burleigh||1607||1619||New creation
|-
|Lord Cranstoun (1609)||William Cranstoun, 1st Lord Cranstoun||1609||1627||New creation
|-
|Lord Mackenzie of Kintail (1609)||Kenneth Mackenzie, 1st Lord Mackenzie of Kintail||1609||1611||New creation
|-
|Lord Pittenweem (1609)||Frederick Stewart, 1st Lord Pittenweem||1609||1625||New creation
|-
|Lord Maderty (1609)||James Drummond, 1st Lord Madderty||1609||1623||New creation
|-
|Lord Dingwall (1609)||Richard Preston, 1st Lord Dingwall||1609||1628||New creation
|-
|}

Peerage of Ireland

|Earl of Kildare (1316)||Gerald FitzGerald, 14th Earl of Kildare||1599||1612||
|-
|Earl of Ormond (1328)||Thomas Butler, 10th Earl of Ormond||1546||1614||
|-
|Earl of Waterford (1446)||Gilbert Talbot, 7th Earl of Waterford||1590||1616||
|-
|Earl of Tyrone (1542)||Hugh O'Neill, 3rd Earl of Tyrone||1562||1608||Attainted
|-
|rowspan=2|Earl of Clanricarde (1543)||Ulick Burke, 3rd Earl of Clanricarde||1582||1601||Died
|-
|Richard Burke, 4th Earl of Clanricarde||1601||1635||
|-
|Earl of Thomond (1543)||Donogh O'Brien, 4th Earl of Thomond||1581||1624||
|-
|Earl of Desmond (1600)||James FitzGerald, 1st Earl of Desmond||1600||1601||New creation; died, title extinct
|-
|Earl of Tyrconnell (1603)||Rory O'Donnell, 1st earl of Tyrconnell||1603||1608||New creation; fled the country, and died
|-
|Viscount Gormanston (1478)||Jenico Preston, 5th Viscount Gormanston||1599||1630||
|-
|Viscount Buttevant (1541)||David de Barry, 5th Viscount Buttevant||1581||1617||
|-
|rowspan=2|Viscount Mountgarret (1550)||Edmund Butler, 2nd Viscount Mountgarret||1571||1602||Died
|-
|Richard Butler, 3rd Viscount Mountgarret||1602||1651||
|-
|Viscount Butler of Tulleophelim (1603)||Theobald Butler, 1st Viscount Butler of Tulleophelim||1603||1613||New creation
|-
|Baron Athenry (1172)||Edmond I de Bermingham||1580||1612||
|-
|Baron Kingsale (1223)||John de Courcy, 18th Baron Kingsale||1599||1628||
|-
|rowspan=2|Baron Kerry (1223)||Patrick Fitzmaurice, 17th Baron Kerry||1590||1600||Died
|-
|Thomas Fitzmaurice, 18th Baron Kerry||1600||1630||
|-
|Baron Slane (1370)||William Fleming, 11th Baron Slane||1597||1612||
|-
|rowspan=2|Baron Howth (1425)||Nicholas St Lawrence, 9th Baron Howth||1589||1606||Died
|-
|Christopher St Lawrence, 10th Baron Howth||1606||1619||
|-
|Baron Killeen (1449)||Christopher Plunkett, 9th Baron Killeen||1595||1613||
|-
|Baron Trimlestown (1461)||Robert Barnewall, 7th Baron Trimlestown||1598||1639||
|-
|rowspan=3|Baron Dunsany (1462)||Patrick Plunkett, 7th Baron of Dunsany||1564||1601||Died
|-
|Christopher Plunkett, 8th Baron of Dunsany||1601||1603||Died
|-
|Patrick Plunkett, 9th Baron of Dunsany||1603||1668||
|-
|rowspan=2|Baron Delvin (1486)||Christopher Nugent, 6th Baron Delvin||1559||1602||Died
|-
|Richard Nugent, 7th Baron Delvin||1602||1642||
|-
|rowspan=2|Baron Power (1535)||Richard Power, 4th Baron Power||1592||1607||Died
|-
|John Power, 5th Baron Power||1607||1661||
|-
|Baron Dunboyne (1541)||James Butler, 2nd/12th Baron Dunboyne||1566||1624||
|-
|rowspan=2|Baron Louth (1541)||Oliver Plunkett, 4th Baron Louth||1575||1607||Died
|-
|Matthew Plunkett, 5th Baron Louth||1607||1629||
|-
|Baron Upper Ossory (1541)||Florence Fitzpatrick, 3rd Baron Upper Ossory||1581||1613||
|-
|Baron Inchiquin (1543)||Dermod O'Brien, 5th Baron Inchiquin||1597||1624||
|-
|Baron Bourke of Castleconnell (1580)||Edmund Bourke, 5th Baron Bourke of Connell||1599||1635||
|-
|Baron Cahir (1583)||Thomas Butler, 2nd Baron Cahir||1596||1627||
|-
|}

References

 

1600
1600s in England
1600s in Ireland
1600s in Scotland
Peers
Peers
Peers
1600
Peers
Peers